Morena Ramoreboli is a South African manager who currently manages Botswana Premier League side Jwaneng Galaxy Football Club.

Career
He first emerged in 2013 when leading third tier Maluti FET College to victory over Orlando Pirates in the 2012–13 Nedbank Cup.
 
He later took over as caretaker coach of the South Africa national soccer team, Bafana Bafana, and led them to the 2021 COSAFA Cup title.

After taking charge of Jwaneng Galaxy, he led them to the group stages of the African Champions League for the first time in 2021–22.

Honours

National Team Honours
 COSAFA CUP:
 Winners: 2021 (with South Africa)

References

South Africa national soccer team managers
Year of birth missing (living people)
Living people
South African soccer managers